Kalkans, Kolkans, Kalki, Kolki, Kalkan people — ethnonym of the Ingush used in Russian sources of the 16th-17th centuries. The ethnonym corresponds to the self-name of the Ingush - Ghalghaï.

History 
Kalkans are first mentioned in the second half of the 16th century in numerous reports of attacks done on Russian ambassador armies in Darial Gorge by Kalkans. The earliest mention of Kalkans can be found in 1590 article list of knyaz of Zvenigorod and diak of Torkh, when the Kolkans attacked Russian ambassador army.

References

Bibliography 
 
 
 

Ethnonyms
Ethnonyms of the Ingush